U Aquarii, abbreviated U Aqr, is a variable star in the equatorial constellation of Aquarius. It is invisible to the naked eye, having an apparent visual magnitude that ranges from 10.6 down to as low as 15.9. In 1990, W. A. Lawson and associates provided a distance estimate of  based on the assumption of a bolometric magnitude of −5. It appears to lie several kiloparsecs below the galactic plane, and thus may belong to an old stellar population.

The stellar classification of this star is C-Hd, and it is classified as a R Coronae Borealis variable. It is a carbon star with a hydrogen-deficient spectra that also shows evidence of s-process elements, including overabundances of strontium and yttrium, but no barium. This combination of properties is exceptionally rare; only one other example has been found as of 2012. The elemental abundances are explained as the result of a single neutron exposure event, which is difficult to reconcile with a conjecture that this may be a post-AGB-type star. In 1999, U Aqr was proposed to be a Thorne-Zytkow object, instead of being a simple R Coronae Borealis variable.

References

Carbon stars
R Coronae Borealis variables
Aquarius (constellation)
Durchmusterung objects
108876
Aquarii, U